Janaya Khan is a social activist from Toronto, Ontario, Canada. Khan is a co-founder of Black Lives Matter Toronto as well as an international ambassador for the Black Lives Matter Network. Khan identifies as black, queer, and gender-nonconforming. Much of their work analyzes intersectional topics including the Black Lives Matter movement, queer theory, Black feminism, and organized protest strategies.

Personal life and education
Khan was born and raised in Toronto, Ontario to a Trinidadian father and a British Jamaican mother who emigrated to Canada. Khan received a Bachelor of Arts from York University, graduating with an honours degree in English language and literature. Khan currently resides in Los Angeles serving as program director for Color Of Change and as a speaker with Keppler Speakers Bureau. Khan is married to Black Lives Matter co-founder Patrisse Cullors. Khan is an author and competitive amateur boxer.

Activism
Khan believes that the sole responsibility of the police is to manufacture criminals and that the police do not keep people safe. They (Khan) would rather have "rapid response justice teams" in the place of police.

In a 2016 interview with Maclean's magazine, they recalled the difficulty of growing up with an intersectional identity in a society with limited resources and knowledge on intersectionality and transfeminism. Khan states that actions like carding (a Canadian police policy where people are stopped and questioned not in relation to a specific offence) made them realize how normalized their community had been to a heavy police presence accompanied by biased questioning.  Incidences like this initiated their path into activism and the ultimate inception of Black Lives Matter Toronto.

In October 2014, Khan and fellow Black Lives Matter Toronto co-founder Sandy Hudson organized an action of solidarity following the death of 33-year-old Jermaine Carby, who was shot and killed during a routine traffic stop in Brampton, Ontario, on September 24, 2014. This incident occurred a month after the August 9 shooting of Michael Brown in the United States. After announcing the protest, around 4,000 people gathered to demonstrate in solidarity outside the US Consulate. Wanting to build on this momentum, they decided to meet with Los Angeles-based Patrisse Cullors, one of the founders of the Black Lives Matter movement in the United States. This meeting launched the foundations for Black Lives Matter to become an international movement rather than one based only in the United States.

Khan has led a number of demonstrations and events in Toronto, mainly based on instances of police brutality in the United States and Canada. In July 2016, they helped organize a sit-in during Pride Toronto, where protesters came prepared with a list of demands including more representation of minority groups and no uniformed police presence during Pride.

The New York Post reported on January 29, 2022, that the Black Lives Matter Global Network Foundation transferred millions to a Canadian charity run by Janaya Khan to purchase a sprawling mansion that had once served as the headquarters of the Communist Party. M4BJ, a Toronto-based non-profit set up by Khan and other Canadian activists, purchased the 10,000-square foot historic property for the equivalent of $6.3 million in cash in July 2021, according to Toronto property records viewed by the Post. Khan resigned from the group in 2021, a month after The Post revealed that they had spent $3.2 million on homes in Georgia and Los Angeles. Khan vigorously denied that BLM donations were used to buy the homes.

Lectures
Khan has presented across Canada at a number of institutions, including the University of Toronto and York University. They have also given talks at many campuses in the United States, including Bryn Mawr College and Emerson College. In 2016, they were joined by Black Lives Matter co-founder Opal Tometi to speak at Smith College's "When and Where I Enter" symposium.

Recognition and awards
Khan is the recipient of multiple awards, including the 2015 Bromley Armstrong Human Rights Award from the Toronto & York Region Labour Council, and was named one of "Toronto's Most Influential" by Toronto Life in 2016. Their work has been featured on sites such as The Root, Al Jazeera, and the Huffington Post.

Notes

References

Year of birth missing (living people)
Living people
Black Canadian activists
Canadian human rights activists
Activists from Toronto
York University alumni
Black Canadian LGBT people
Canadian LGBT rights activists
Black Lives Matter people
Canadian people of British descent
Canadian people of Trinidad and Tobago descent
Canadian people of Jamaican descent